
Year 438 BC was a year of the pre-Julian Roman calendar. At the time, it was known as the Year of the Tribunate of Mamercinus, Iullus and Cincinnatus (or, less frequently, year 316 Ab urbe condita). The denomination 438 BC for this year has been used since the early medieval period, when the Anno Domini calendar era became the prevalent method in Europe for naming years.

Events 
 By place 
 Greece 
 The Parthenon on the Acropolis at Athens is completed by Ictinus and Callicrates and is consecrated after 9 years of construction. It is dedicated at the Panathenaea (a festival held in honour of Athena every four years on the Acropolis).
 The colossal statue of the Athena Parthenos, which Phidias has made for the Parthenon, is completed and dedicated. It is made of gold and ivory and stands some 12 metres high.
 Telephus, a play by the renowned playwright Euripides, is produced in Athens. This tragedy did not survive to modern times.

 Italy 
 The city of Capua falls to the Samnites.

 By topic 
 Literature 
 The Greek playwright Euripides' play Alcestis is performed in the Dionysia, an Athenian dramatic festival.

 Art 
 Three seated Goddesses (possibly Hestia, Dione and Aphrodite), from the east pediment of the Parthenon, are made (finished in 432 BC). They are now kept at The British Museum in London.
 The Ionic frieze on the north side of the Parthenon, is created (finished in 432 BC). Parts of this frieze are now preserved in museums in Europe, including the Horsemen (at the British Museum, London), and the Marshals and Young Women (now at Musée du Louvre, Paris), which once formed part of the Procession on the frieze.

Births

Deaths 
 Cincinnatus, Roman politician, consul and dictator (b. 519 BC)

References